Władysław Kaliński (pseudonym Zubosz) was a Polish Chartered Infantry Colonel who commanded the 13th Infantry Division during World War II and led the Battle of Tomaszów Mazowiecki before being captured after the fall of Warsaw.

Biography
He was born on March 22, 1891 in Rohatyn, the then poviat town of the Kingdom of Galicia and Lodomeria, in the family of Jan and Katarzyna née Szwed. He passed his secondary school-leaving examination in 1912. During World War I, on August 3, 1914, he joined the Polish Legions, where he served until July 1917. He was promoted successively to the rank of ensign on November 1, 1916 and second lieutenant on January 1, 1917. In September 1917, after the Oath crisis, as an Austrian citizen, he was incorporated into the Austro-Hungarian Army and served in it until August 1918.

In November 1918 he was admitted to the Polish Armed Forces with the rank of lieutenant. He took part in the Polish–Soviet War. In 1919 he was promoted to the rank of captain. He was given the rank of major of the infantry and in the group of officers of the former Polish Legions.

After the end of conflict, he was the head of the Training Department in the First Department of Primary Weapons of the Ministry of Military Affairs from September 19, 1920 - July 21, 1922 and the battalion commander in the 36th Infantry Regiment of the Academic Legion from July 21, 1922 to November 30, 1922.

From November 30, 1922 to October 1, 1924, he was a student of the Normal Course at the Wyższa Szkoła Wojenna in Warsaw. On October 1, 1924, after completing the course and obtaining the academic title of an officer of the General Staff , he was assigned to the Closed War Council Office for the position of the head of the training department. On December 1, 1924, the President of the Republic of Poland, Stanisław Wojciechowski, at the request of the Minister of Military Affairs, Major General Władysław Sikorski, promoted him to the rank of lieutenant-colonel with seniority on August 15, 1924 and 97th position in the corps of infantry officers. On March 3, 1926, he was transferred to the 3rd Division of the Polish General Staff to the position of the head of the "Cover" section.

On June 25, 1927 he was transferred to the Border Protection Corps to the position of the commander of the 3rd Border Protection Half-Brigade in Podświl, and later in Berezwecz. On December 10, 1931, he was promoted to the rank of colonel with seniority on January 1, 1932 and ranked 6th in the corps of infantry officers. In 1936 he became the commander of the infantry division of the 14th Infantry Division in Poznań.

In 1939, he became the commander of the 13th Infantry Division and he commanded this division during the Invasion of Poland, initially as a part of the Prusy Army. After the army was broken up by the Germans, he made his way to Warsaw with some of his troops . Here he received an order from the commander of the "Warsaw" Army to recreate the 13th Infantry Division from the remaining parts of the broken divisions of the 13th, 19th Infantry, 29th Infantry Divisions and the Workers' Defense Brigade of Warsaw. After the fall of Warsaw , he was taken prisoner by the Germans. He spent the war in Oflag VII-A Murnau. After being liberated in April 1945 from a POW camp by the United States Army, he left for the United Kingdom and lived in London, where he lived until his death.

Awards
Virtuti Militari, Silver Cross (No. 7072 - May 17, 1922)
Cross of Independence (May 24, 1932 "for work in the work of regaining independence")
Order of Polonia Restituta, Officer's Cross (November 10, 1928 "for merits in the field of organization of the army and independence work")
Cross of Valour (Awarded 4 times)
Cross of Merit, Golden cross (March 19, 1937 "for merits in military service")

References

Bibliography
 
 
 
 
 
 
 
 
 

1891 births
1952 deaths
Military personnel from Warsaw
Polish military personnel of World War II
Recipients of the Cross of Independence
Recipients of the Gold Cross of Merit (Poland)
Austro-Hungarian military personnel of World War I
Polish Military Organisation members
Polish people of World War I
Polish legionnaires (World War I)
Polish emigrants to the United Kingdom